Lars Andersson may refer to:

 Lars Andersson (canoeist) (born 1948), Swedish Olympic canoer
 Lars Andersson (cyclist) (born 1988), Swedish cyclist
 Lars Andersson (equestrian) (born 1956), Swedish Olympic equestrian
 Lars Andersson (footballer), Swedish footballer
 Lars Andersson (politician) (born 1964), Swedish politician
 Lars Andersson (writer) (born 1954), Swedish writer, winner of the 1996 Samfundet De Nio Grand Prize
 Lars Andersson i Hedensbyn (1888–1974), Swedish politician
 Lars Gabriel Andersson (1868–1951), Swedish educator and herpetologist
 Laurentius Andreae (c. 1470–1552), Swedish clergyman and scholar

See also
Lars Anderson (disambiguation)